Harswell is a village in the East Riding of Yorkshire, England.

It forms part of the civil parish of Everingham.

In 1823 Harswell was a village and civil parish in the Wapentake of Harthill. Population at the time was 78, with occupations that included five farmers, and a carrier who operated between the village and Market Weighton once a week.

The village church is dedicated to St Peter. There has been a church in Harswell from the late 12th century and the building that was present in 1823 was described by Baines as "a small ancient structure". It was rebuilt in 1870-1871 and parish records, dating back to 1653, are held by the Borthwick Institute in York.

Harswell was served by Everingham railway station on the Selby to Driffield Line between 1853 and 1954. The station house is now a Grade II listed building.

References

External links

Villages in the East Riding of Yorkshire